Mitsuishi Dam  is a rockfill dam located in Hokkaido Prefecture in Japan. The dam is used for irrigation. The catchment area of the dam is 25 km2. The dam impounds about 74  ha of land when full and can store 8170 thousand cubic meters of water. The construction of the dam was started on 1970 and completed in 1991.

References

Dams in Hokkaido